André Meynier (11 September 1901 – 22 March 1983) was a French geographer born in Angers, France. He was the husband of Yvonne Meynier, whom he married on August 20, 1927.

1901 births
1983 deaths
French geographers
People from Angers
20th-century geographers